Salvia handelii is a perennial plant that is native to Sichuan province in China, growing on grassy slopes on limestone mountains at  elevation.

Notes

handelii
Flora of China